Just the Hits was a compilation album series released in New Zealand from 1999 to 2001.

Volume 1

"I Try " - Macy Gray
"Genie in a Bottle" - Christina Aguilera
"If You Had My Love" - Jennifer Lopez
"Larger than Life" - Backstreet Boys
"Keep On Movin'" - Five
"Summertime of Our Lives" - A1
"Blue (Da Ba Dee)" - Eiffel 65
"Sun Is Shining" - Bob Marley vs. Funkstar De Luxe
"2 Times" - Ann Lee
"If Everybody Looked the Same" - Groove Armada
"Shake Your Bon-Bon" - Ricky Martin
"Burning Down the House" - Tom Jones featuring The Cardigans
"Undone" - Stellar*
"Unpretty" - TLC
"(You Drive Me) Crazy" - Britney Spears
"Jesse Hold On" - B*Witched
"Candy" - Mandy Moore
"Last to Know" - Human Nature
"Flying Without Wings" - Westlife

Volume 2

"Move Your Body" - Eiffel 65
"Say My Name" - Destiny's Child (mistakenly credited as Say Your Name)
"Don't Wanna Let You Go" - Five
"So Real" - Mandy Moore
"Absolutely Everybody" - Vanessa Amorosi
"What a Girl Wants" - Christina Aguilera
"Seasons in the Sun" - Westlife
"Private Emotion" - Ricky Martin
"Still" - Macy Gray
"Drive" - Strawpeople
"Why Does My Heart Feel So Bad?" - Moby
"Don't Give Up" - Chicane featuring Bryan Adams
"Every Girl" - Stellar*
"I Wanna Love You Forever" - Jessica Simpson
"Do You Want My Love" - Coco Lee
"Bring It All to Me" - Blaque featuring JC Chasez
"Sex Bomb" - Tom Jones & Mousse T.
"Absolutely (Story of a Girl)" - Nine Days

Volume 3

 "I'm Outta Love" - Anastacia
 "Freestyler" - Bomfunk MC's
 "Come On Over Baby (All I Want Is You)" - Christina Aguilera
 "Spinning Around" - Kylie Minogue
 "Lucky" - Britney Spears
 "Jumpin', Jumpin'" - Destiny's Child
 "Shackles (Praise You)" - Mary Mary
 "Don't Think I'm Not" - Kandi
 "It's Gonna Be Me" - NSYNC
 "The One" - Backstreet Boys
 "There You Go" - Pink
 "Why Didn't You Call Me" - Macy Gray
 "Porcelain" - Moby
 "Fill Me In" - Craig David
 "I Will Love Again" - Lara Fabian
 "You Sang to Me" - Marc Anthony
 "I Think I'm in Love with You" - Jessica Simpson
 "He Wasn't Man Enough" - Toni Braxton
 "Maria Maria" - Santana
 "Don't Stop the Revolution" - Breathe

Volume 4

 "Love Don't Cost a Thing" - Jennifer Lopez
 "She Bangs" - Ricky Martin
 "Lydia" - Fur Patrol
 "Teenage Dirtbag" - Wheatus
 "Ms. Jackson" - Outkast
 "All Hooked Up" - All Saints
 "You Make Me Sick" - Pink
 "So Good" - Destiny's Child
 "My Love" - Westlife
 "The Way You Love Me" - Faith Hill
 "Cowboys & Kisses" - Anastacia
 "If You're Gone" - Matchbox Twenty
 "Live Without It" - Killing Heidi
 "Crazy for This Girl" - Evan and Jaron
 "Babylon" - David Gray
 "Hold Me" - Savage Garden
 "Tell Me How You Feel" - Joy Enriquez
 "Be Yourself" - Morcheeba
 "Saving Mary" - Fused

Volume 5

"Bootylicious" - Destiny's Child
"Play" - Jennifer Lopez
"U Remind Me" - Usher
"Miss California" - Dante Thomas
"Romeo" - Basement Jaxx
"Another Chance" - Roger Sanchez
"Fade Away" - Che Fu
"Follow Me" - Uncle Kracker
"Drops of Jupiter" - Train
"Dancing in the Moonlight" - Toploader
"In My Pocket" - Mandy Moore
"Uptown Girl" - Westlife
"Things I've Seen" - The Spooks
"Run for Cover" - Sugababes
"Walking Away" - Craig David
"Here with Me"- Dido
"Youthful" - Anika Moa
"Imitation of Life" - R.E.M.
"The Motivation Proclamation" - Good Charlotte
"Drive" - Incubus

Volume 6

"Hit 'Em Up Style (Oops!) " - Blu Cantrell 
"I'm Real " - Jennifer Lopez 
"Starlight" - The Supermen Lovers 
"Let's Dance" -  Five
"Little L" - Jamiroquai 
"When You're Looking Like That" - Westlife 
"Hunter" - Dido
"Sweet Baby" - Macy Gray featuring Erykah Badu 
"All It Takes" - Stellar 
"Astronaut" - The Feelers 
"Yeah, Yeah, Yeah" - Uncle Kracker
"Random" - Che Fu
"It Don't Matter" - Rehab 
"Every Other Time" - LFO
"Here's to the Night" - Eve 6 
"A Little Respect" - Wheatus 
"I Wanna Be Bad" - Willa Ford 
"All or Nothing" - O-Town
"I'm So Excited (The Bum Dance)" - Sara-Marie and Sirens

1990s compilation albums
2000s compilation albums
Pop compilation albums
Compilation album series
EMI Records compilation albums